The Zau de Câmpie gas field is a natural gas field located in Zau de Câmpie, Mureș County. It was discovered in 1915 and developed by  Romgaz.  It began production in 1920 and produces natural gas and condensates. The total proven reserves of the Zau de Câmpie gas field are around 416 billion cubic feet (12 km³), and production is slated to be around 3.6 million cubic feet/day (0.1×105m³) in 2010.

References

Natural gas fields in Romania